Alfred Ernest Tredinnick (16 June 1873 – 19 May 1910) was an Australian rules footballer who played for the Melbourne Football Club in the Victorian Football League (VFL).

Tredinnick played football for Rovers Football Club in the Western Australian Football Association in 1898 before moving to the Goldfields Football Association and playing for Kalgoorlie from 1899 to 1900, where he was an all-round sportsman who also played cricket and ran competitively as a sprinter. He was an employee of the Western Australian Bank while living in Kalgoorlie, which meant he had to run under the assumed name "Alf Hall".

He returned to Victoria in 1901 and played seven games for Melbourne in the Victorian Football League during that season. In 1902, he won the Stawell Gift, Australia's most prestigious running race. Tredinnick died after a short illness in 1910; his obituary remembered him as "one of the best footballers and athletes in the Castlemaine district".

Notes

External links 

Demonwiki profile

1873 births
Australian rules footballers from Western Australia
Rovers Football Club players
Goldfields Football League players
Melbourne Football Club players
Stawell Gift winners
Australian male sprinters
1910 deaths
Australian rules footballers from Victoria (Australia)